USA Network (simply USA) is an American basic cable television channel owned by the NBCUniversal Television and Streaming division of Comcast's NBCUniversal. It was originally launched in 1977 as Madison Square Garden Sports Network, one of the first national sports cable television channels, before being relaunched under its current name on April 9, 1980. Since then, USA steadily gained popularity through its original programming, a long-established partnership with WWF/WWE and, for many years, limited sports programming that increased significantly in 2022 after the shutdown of NBCSN.

 USA Network is commercially available to about 90.4 million households (98% of households with pay television) in the US.

History

Madison Square Garden Sports Network (1977–1980)
USA Network originally launched on September 22, 1977, as the Madison Square Garden Sports Network (not to be confused with the New York City-area regional sports network of the same name now simply known as the MSG Network). The network was founded by cable provider UA-Columbia Cablevision and the Madison Square Garden Corp. From its beginning (and for the next two decades) the network was run by chairwoman and CEO Kay Koplovitz. The channel was one of the first national cable television channels, utilizing satellite delivery as opposed to the then-industry standard microwave relay to distribute its programming to cable systems. Unlike other cable networks at the time, it also was the first to rely greatly on advertising revenue. At launch the network mostly broadcast sporting events from Madison Square Garden to a national audience (sharing programming with the aforementioned MSG Network). The network quickly added a mix of college and less well-known professional sports held at other venues, similar to those found during the early years of ESPN. In 1978, children's programming was also added to the lineup.

MCA/Paramount ownership (1981–1994) and Time ownership (1981–1987) 
On April 9, 1980, the channel changed its name to USA Network. It also added a children's program called Calliope to its schedule and some talk shows in an effort to appeal to women. The new network also offered a programming block from Black Entertainment Television (which would eventually launch as its own network) and carried C-SPAN during the day.

In 1981, ownership of the network changed. First, Time Inc. agreed to buy UA-Columbia's share of the network contingent upon Madison Square Garden owner Gulf + Western transferring its share of the network to its Paramount Pictures division. Shortly thereafter MCA Inc. also bought into the network with the three companies all owning equal shares. The three partners had a non-compete clause that would prevent them from owning other basic cable networks independently from the USA joint venture; however, it was acknowledged that Time also owned powerful USA Network rival Home Box Office. The said clause would cause Time Inc. to drop out of the venture in 1987, as the company attempted (but failed) to buy CNN from Ted Turner and run it independently from USA. MCA and Paramount subsequently became the sole owners of the channel (being a 50/50 joint venture between the two companies).

C-SPAN finally stopped sharing satellite space with USA on April 1, 1982, after having launched its own 24-hour feed two months earlier. USA began operating on a 24-hour schedule, programming its new daytime block with the British soap opera Coronation Street, a health-oriented show named Alive and Well, and an afternoon movie.

In fall 1982, the channel began running a mix of 1960s and 1970s Hanna-Barbera cartoons each weekday evening from 6:00 to 7:00 p.m. as part of the new USA Cartoon Express block, with sports programming airing after 7:00 p.m., which were rebroadcast during the overnight hours. Weekends featured a mix of movies, some older drama series and talk shows during the morning hours, and sports during the afternoons and evenings. Overnights consisted of old low-budget films and film shorts, and music videos as part of a show called Night Flight.

Between 1984 and 1986, USA's programming focus began shifting away from sports, and shifted towards general entertainment programs not found on broadcast stations, including some less common network drama series and cartoons.

For the 1985–1986 season, the channel had four hours of original and exclusive shows. One original series from the 1985–1986 season was the comedy Check It Out!. USA, wanting to become the flagship cable channel and compete directly with the broadcast networks, committed to 26 half-hours of part exclusive off-broadcast network and part original programming for the 1986–1987 season at an increase of $30 million. In one case, the channel picked up Airwolf for 58 off-network episodes, while commissioning 24 new episodes without the original cast.

One tradition on USA was an afternoon lineup of game show reruns mixed in with several original low-budget productions that aired over the years. It began in October 1984 with reruns of The Gong Show and Make Me Laugh. In September 1985, the network began airing its first original game show, a revival of the mid-1970s game show Jackpot; two more original game shows, Love Me, Love Me Not, and a revival of the short-lived 1980 series Chain Reaction, were added in September 1986. More shows were progressively added soon afterward such as The Joker's Wild, Tic-Tac-Dough, Press Your Luck, High Rollers, and Hollywood Squares (with John Davidson as its "Square-Master", or host), along with Wipeout, Face the Music, and Name That Tune. In June 1987, the channel debuted another original game show, Bumper Stumpers. (All four USA original game shows in this era were taped in Canada.) When it began, the game-show block ran for an hour, but it expanded significantly the following year. By 1989, the network ran game shows Monday through Fridays from 12:00 to 5:00 p.m. eastern. USA also aired late night reruns of Procter & Gamble soap operas The Edge Of Night  from August 5, 1985, to January 19, 1989 along with Search For Tomorrow from 1987 until the summer of 1989. In January 1989, USA debuted USA Up All Night, a showcase of low-budget feature films that aired as part of its weekend overnight schedule. Up All Night became a cult favorite among viewers for the comedic wraparound segments that were usually shown during breaks leading into (and sometimes, out of) commercials and between films that were hosted by comedian Gilbert Gottfried and model/actress Rhonda Shear, the latter of whom had replaced original co-host Caroline Schlitt in 1991. Though this program was discontinued on March 7, 1998, late-night movie telecasts on USA continued to be branded under the "Up All Night" banner until 2002.

Short news updates, branded as USA Updates, were broadcast early on, from 1989 until 2000. These segments were first produced out of KYW-TV in Philadelphia, owing to the fact that the station had already produced a number of syndicated news services (including the Group W Newsfeed) and Steve Bell, the former newsreader on Good Morning America, was employed as a primary anchor at the station. By 1993, production of USA Updates had been taken over by the All News Channel (operated as a joint venture of Hubbard Broadcasting's and Viacom's CONUS Communications); Bell had left KYW in 1992, when KYW's news operations were heavily revamped in response to falling ratings. Via the ANC connection, USA also aired the financial news program First Business (then produced by CONUS) at 6:30am weekday mornings for a time (the network had previously carried Wall Street Journal-produced financial news updates and a late-night report in the 1980s). The ANC-produced updates continued through 2000 (ANC was suffering heavily around this time due to competition with other cable news channels such as CNN and the then-similarly formatted Headline News, and ended up shutting down in 2002); USA Network has not carried any news programming since the news updates were removed.

USA was the first basic cable channel to pre-empt the syndicated television market by purchasing a package of 26 films from Disney's Touchstone Pictures library in October 1989. To obtain the package, it spent an estimated $50 million to $60 million, with films including such box office hits as Dead Poets Society, Good Morning, Vietnam, and Three Men and a Baby.

The tradition of game show reruns continued into the 1990s with the $25,000 and $100,000 Pyramids, the early 1990s revivals of The Joker's Wild and Tic-Tac-Dough, and other well-known shows such as Scrabble, Sale of the Century, Talk About, and Caesars Challenge. Additionally, two more original game shows were added in June 1994; these were Free 4 All and Quicksilver. In September 1991, the block was reduced to three hours, from 2:00 to 5:00 p.m. Eastern. However, an additional hour was added in March 1993. In November 1994, the game show block was cut back to only two hours, from 2:00 to 4:00 p.m.

On September 24, 1992, USA launched a sister network, the Sci-Fi Channel (now Syfy), focusing on science fiction series and films.

In January 1993, the channel began showing WWF Monday Night Raw, which was the first major professional wrestling program to show storylines playing out in front of an audience. In September 1993, USA adopted a new on-air look centering on the slogan "The Remote Stops Here", with flat graphics suggesting a television camera's in-lens symbols and music consisting of electric guitar and synthesized noises, though the movie presentation openers were retained from the previous design.

USA Networks ownership (1994–2002)
In 1994, Paramount Pictures parent Paramount Communications was sold to the original iteration of Viacom; the following year, MCA was acquired by Seagram. In April 1996, Viacom, which also owned MTV Networks, launched a new classic television network called TV Land. MCA subsequently sued Viacom for breach of contract, claiming that it had violated the non-compete clause in its joint venture agreement with MCA. A judge presiding over the case sided with MCA, and Viacom subsequently sold its stake in USA and the Sci-Fi Channel to Seagram for $1.7 billion. In turn, Seagram sold a controlling interest in the networks to Barry Diller-who was previously head of Paramount Pictures when the company owned part of the network in the early 1980s and who was also credited with putting together the 1981 agreement which resulted in joint Paramount-Time-MCA ownership of the network- in February 1998, which led to the creation of USA Networks, Inc.; the company also merged the cable channels with Diller's existing television properties including the Home Shopping Network and its broadcasting unit Silver King Broadcasting (which was restructured as USA Broadcasting, and eventually sold its stations to Univision Communications in 2001 to form the nucleus of Telefutura/UniMás).

In July 1995, USA began simulcasting the upstart business news channel Bloomberg Information TV Monday thru Saturday from 5:00 to 7:00 a.m. Eastern; in 2004, the Bloomberg simulcast moved to E!, where it ran until 2007 (USA was actually the second television network to simulcast Bloomberg's programming, the now-defunct American Independent Network also carried a simulcast of the channel during the mid-1990s). Bloomberg purchased the airtime from USA. In October 1995, the network dropped the entire game show block; it was replaced with a block called USA Live, which carried reruns of Love Connection and The People's Court, with live hosted wraparound segments between shows; that block was dropped by 1997 (some of the game shows that USA had aired can still be seen on GSN and Buzzr).

On June 17, 1996, the network unveiled a new on-air appearance, which included the introduction of a new logo (incorporating a star ridged into the "U" of the now-serifed "USA" logotype, replacing the Futura-typeface logo that had been in use since the network's start under the USA Network name in 1980), and a three-note jingle. Network IDs, feature presentation intros for movies and promo graphics were based around a behind-the-scenes look at the fictional "USA Studios"; some of the IDs showed people in the control room, while a studio that was being set-up by a crew was the backdrop for the "Tonight" menu that displayed the evening's schedule. Opening sequences leading into movie telecasts showed people running through the "USA Studios Film Vault". The new look coincided with a shift in focus, more towards off-network reruns and original programming; game shows and court shows were dropped from the schedule, while cartoons were phased out. USA Studios also became the branding for USA-produced programming at this point. This logo was replaced in July 1999 in favor of a 'USA flag'-styled logo (whose design was slightly modified in 2002).

In September 1996, USA replaced the USA Cartoon Express with the action-oriented children's block, USA Action Extreme Team; the channel discontinued its animation block outright in September 1998 (other than airing the first-run teen sitcom USA High and reruns of Saved by the Bell: The New Class from 1997 to 2001, USA has not aired children's programming since that time), and replaced it with a block called "USAM", which advertised itself as "Primetime Comedy in the Morning". The block mainly featured sitcoms originally aired on network television that were cancelled before making it to 100 episodes (such as The Jeff Foxworthy Show, Hearts Afire and Something So Right); however, for a time, the block also included the 1989–1994 episodes of the Bob Saget run of America's Funniest Home Videos. "USAM" was discontinued in 2002; by that point, the only sitcoms airing on USA were daytime and late night reruns of Martin and overnight airings of Living Single, Cheers and Wings, with drama series and movies populating much of the channel's daytime and primetime schedule.

In 2000, USA Networks bought Canadian media company North American Television, Inc. (a joint partnership between the Canadian Broadcasting Corporation and Power Corporation of Canada), owner of cable television channels Trio and Newsworld International (the CBC continued to handle programming responsibilities for NWI until 2005, when eventual USA owner Vivendi sold the channel to a group led by Al Gore, who relaunched it as Current TV). One major shock happened when USA lost the broadcasting rights of the WWF to Viacom in June 2000; Raw (which had been retitled Raw is War) was moved to TNN in September of that year.

Vivendi ownership (2002–2003)
In May 2002, USA Networks sold its non-shopping television and film assets (including USA Network, the Sci-Fi Channel, Trio, USA Films (which was rechristened as Focus Features) and Studios USA) to Vivendi Universal. USA and the other channels were folded into Vivendi's Universal Television Group.

In July 2002, the channel debuted Monk, a comedy-drama police procedural that starred Tony Shalhoub as Adrian Monk, a former San Francisco police inspector-turned-consultant who suffers from various obsessive-compulsive behaviors that include the ability to pay attention to detail when solving crimes. It became one of USA Network's first breakout hit series, and ran for eight seasons until it ended on December 4, 2009.

NBCUniversal/Comcast ownership (2003–present)
In 2003, General Electric agreed to merge NBC and its sibling companies with Vivendi Universal's North American-based filmed entertainment assets, including Universal Pictures and Universal Television Group in a multibillion-dollar purchase, renaming the merged company NBC Universal. GE retained an 80% ownership stake in the new company, while Vivendi retained a 20% stake. NBC Universal officially took over as owner of USA and its sibling cable channels (except for Newsworld International) in 2004. That year, USA premiered the sci-fi series The 4400.

"Characters Welcome", the "blue sky" era (2005–2016)
In 2005, USA Network introduced a new logo and associated marketing campaign, "Characters Welcome". The slogan was designed to help emphasize the wide range of programming the network offered, and to help USA Network establish itself more prominently as a brand. The launch of the campaign featured promos themed around the daily lives of characters from the network's programs. To contrast itself from the "grittier" offerings of other mainstream cable networks, USA Network's original programming during this era was marked by a focus on comedic and "optimistic" action and drama series, referred to as a "blue sky" approach. Notable examples of this programming strategy included Psych (2006) (which ran for eight seasons, becoming the network's longest-running series), Burn Notice (2007), and Royal Pains (2009). In October 2005, Raw returned to USA after Viacom did not renew its broadcasting agreement with the WWE.

On May 13, 2007 (in advance of NBC's 2007–08 fall upfronts presentation), NBC Universal announced that new episodes of Law & Order: Criminal Intent would be moved to USA beginning with the drama's seventh season in the fall of 2007; episodes would then be re-aired later in the season on NBC, most likely to shore up any programming holes created by the cancellation of a failed new series. Although this is not the first time a broadcast series has moved to cable (USA had acquired first-run rights to the revival of Alfred Hitchcock Presents from NBC in 1987, while The Paper Chase had moved beforehand from CBS to Showtime in 1983), it marked the first time that a series which moved its first-run episodes from broadcast to cable television would continue to air episodes on a broadcast network while it was still a first-run program. On December 7, 2007, it was announced that USA Network would continue broadcasting first-run episodes of Raw through at least 2010.

The June 1, 2008, premiere of In Plain Sight, starring Mary McCormack, was USA's highest-rated series premiere since the 2006 debut of Psych, with 5.3 million viewers. In early 2009, USA Network acquired the network television rights for 24 recent and upcoming Universal Pictures films, including Duplicity, Funny People, Frost/Nixon, Land of the Lost, Milk, and State of Play.

In 2011, control and majority ownership of then-parent NBC Universal passed from General Electric to Comcast. Comcast would buy out GE's remaining ownership in NBCU two years later. USA Network was considered the key piece of the NBC-Comcast merger; Wunderlich Securities analyst Matthew Harrigan projected that USA contributed $9.5 billion to NBCUniversal's $44.8 billion value, with NBC contributing only $408 million. In 2014, the channel had dropped 18% in viewership and out of first place among the major cable channels. USA has been a key NBCUniversal asset accounting for one-third of advertising revenue for NBCUniversal Cable Entertainment Group and $1 billion in annual earnings over the past few years.

In April 2015, it was announced that WWE SmackDown would move to USA from sister network Syfy.

End of the "blue sky" era, expansion of sports coverage (2016–present)
In April 2016, USA Network unveiled a new branding campaign and slogan, "We the Bold". The campaign was designed to reflect the channel's current focus on "rich, captivating stories about unlikely heroes who defy the status quo, push boundaries and are willing to risk everything for what they believe in". USA had quietly discontinued the "Characters Welcome" tagline in the lead-up to the rebranding, whose associated programming shift was led by the premieres of Mr. Robot and Colony. Variety reported that the new programming strategy was designed to appeal to themes of "authenticity, resiliency, bravery and innovation". The Washington Post felt that the re-branding symbolically marked the end of USA's "blue sky" era, as the channel had been increasingly producing more "intense" series with darker themes. NBCUniversal marketing executive Alexandra Shapiro explained that the "Characters Welcome" campaign and associated programming was reflective of the "weirdly optimistic" mood of the network's key demographic at the time.

In August 2016, NBCUniversal acquired the television rights to the Harry Potter film franchise from 2018 through 2025, including the main film series and their spin-offs (with the first, Fantastic Beasts and Where to Find Them, to have its cable premiere in 2019), and other content. On cable, the films are to primarily be aired by USA Network and Syfy, and the deal also includes the ability for Universal Parks & Resorts to offer "exclusive content and events" related to the franchise (Universal Parks had already been involved in The Wizarding World of Harry Potter attractions). The deal succeeded one with Freeform; The Wall Street Journal reported the deal was valued around $250 million over the length of the agreement, making it one of the highest-valued film franchise deals. To launch the new rights, Syfy and USA both aired Harry Potter marathons over the July 13–15, 2018 weekend, airing all eight films (including directors' cuts of the first six) with limited commercial interruption.

Amid the growth of streaming services (including NBCUniversal's newly launched Peacock) and the decline of traditional cable television, USA Network began to cut back on scripted programming, in favor of reality shows, television events (including scripted miniseries), and live programming—the latter including WWE programs and sporting events. In 2020, the network cancelled Dare Me, The Purge, The Sinner, and Treadstone. With the announcement that NBCSN would shut down on December 31, 2021, it was subsequently revealed that USA and Peacock would collectively assume its remaining sports broadcasts.

Programming

USA Network has achieved a viewership foothold with its original programming; this began in the 1990s with initial hits such as Silk Stalkings, Duckman and La Femme Nikita, which were gradually followed in the following two decades by series such as Monk, Psych, Shooter, White Collar, Mr. Robot, Suits, Burn Notice and Royal Pains.

In addition to its original productions, the network airs syndicated reruns of current and former network series such as Law & Order: Special Victims Unit, Chicago P.D., Law & Order: Criminal Intent (which spent the final four seasons of its run as a first-run program on USA) and NCIS. The network also broadcasts a variety of films from the Universal Pictures library and select films from other movie studios (such as Sony Pictures Entertainment, Paramount Pictures, Walt Disney Studios Motion Pictures and Warner Bros. Entertainment), airing primarily as part of its overnight and weekend schedule, and occasionally during primetime on nights when original programming or marathons of its acquired programs are not scheduled.

From 1984 to 2016, the network was the longtime home of the Westminster Kennel Club Dog Show. USA is also the home of WWE's flagship cable program Raw; the series originally aired on the channel from its debut in January 1993 (when the promotion was known as the World Wrestling Federation; Raw itself replaced longtime Monday night standby WWF Prime Time Wrestling) until the series moved to TNN in September 2000, before returning to the channel in October 2005. On January 7, 2016, WWE's second flagship program SmackDown moved to USA Network from Syfy. In 2018, USA renewed its rights to Raw for five additional years, but lost the rights for SmackDown to Fox beginning October 2019. In August 2019, WWE announced that its tertiary weekly program WWE NXT would return to USA Network on September 18, 2019, airing on Wednesday nights in a two-hour live format.

Sports programming

USA Network has a longstanding history with sports, dating back to its existence as the Madison Square Garden Network. The network carried Major League Baseball games on Thursday nights from 1979 to 1983, and the NHL on USA ran from 1979 to 1985. College Football on USA ran from 1980 to 1986, and its telecast of the 1981 Liberty Bowl was the first college bowl game to be exclusively broadcast on cable television. The NBA on USA also aired from 1979 to 1984, the first time that the NBA had a cable television partner. The professional wrestling company WWF/WWE has had a longstanding relationship with the network; WWF Prime Time Wrestling broadcast on USA from 1985-1993 until it was superseded by WWE Raw from 1993 to 2000, and again since 2005. WWE SmackDown aired on the network from January 2016 until October 2019, when it moved to Fox. WWE NXT has aired on the channel since October 2019.

For 17 years from 1981 to 1998, USA aired a weekly boxing show, USA Tuesday Night Fights, which showcased bouts featuring up-and-coming boxers. Tennis on USA aired professional tournaments in the United States from 1984 to 2008, and was the longtime cable home of the US Open before its cable television rights moved to ESPN2 and the Tennis Channel in 2009. The PGA Tour on USA covered the opening two rounds of the Masters Tournament from 1982 to 2007, Ryder Cup matches from 1989 to 2010, and various other events.

The USA Network aired most games of the NFL-run World League of American Football (later NFL Europe/Europa) in its first two seasons of operation in 1991 and 1992; one innovation introduced for the network's WLAF telecasts was the in-helmet camera.

Upon the 2004 purchase of Vivendi Universal by NBC, USA's sports division was immediately merged into NBC Sports. Since 2004, the network has broadcast select events from the Olympic Games, as part of an expansion of NBCUniversal's broadcast rights to the Summer and Winter Olympics that allowed several of the company's cable channels rights to telecast Olympic events live (some of which are later re-aired on tape delay on NBC as part of the network's primetime and late night Olympic coverage). USA Network also carried games from the International Ice Hockey Federation in 2006 and 2010.

During the 2014 Winter Olympics, USA aired Premier League soccer matches in lieu of sister channel NBCSN, due to that channel's full devotion to carrying coverage of Olympic events. After ratings success with those matches, USA began to air mid-afternoon Saturday games weekly during the 2015–16 season. USA also participates in NBC Sports' broader effort of carrying all ten Survival Sunday matches across its numerous channels during the final matchday of the Premier League season. Starting in 2015, USA Network was similarly incorporated into NBC's coverage of the Stanley Cup Playoffs. In 2016, USA aired three NASCAR races as overflow during the 2016 Summer Olympics.

In September 2020, a Notre Dame Fighting Irish football game was scheduled for USA Network due to NBC's commitments to the 2020 U.S. Open. Coverage of a primetime game against Clemson on November 7, 2020, was also briefly moved from NBC to USA Network due to NBC News coverage of a victory speech by president-elect Joe Biden.

With the shutdown of NBCSN at the end of 2021, USA Network once again became the main cable outlet of NBC Sports in 2022, with sports properties such as the Premier League, NASCAR, and the Olympics (including U.S. Olympic trials) moving to USA at this time. The U.S. Open, U.S. Women's Open, The Open Championship, and the Women's Open would move their early-round telecasts from Golf Channel to USA beginning in 2022. USA Network also carried eight games as part of the inaugural season of the revived USFL, and is one of the broadcast partners of the SuperMotocross World Championship and its Supercross and Motocross feeder series.

High definition
High-definition simulcasts of USA Network sports coverage, and reruns of original programs produced in the format, were originally carried by Universal HD. In 2007, USA Network launched a HD feed.

International

Canada
In February 2007, Shaw Communications submitted an application to the Canadian Radio-television and Telecommunications Commission (CRTC), to carry the USA Network in Canada as a foreign service that would be eligible for carriage by domestic cable and satellite providers (and to automatically allow all English-language general interest cable networks from the United States into Canada). However, because of programming rights issues with other Canadian specialty channels, certain programs would be subjected to blackout restrictions, including WWE Raw.

In September 2007, the CRTC refused Shaw's request to carry USA Network in Canada on the basis that the channel carried too much programming that overlapped with the English language digital cable specialty channel Mystery TV (which is then owned by Canwest – later Shaw Media – and formerly, Groupe TVA). However, on September 20, the CRTC stated that it would reconsider their denial of the eligible foreign carriage proposal for USA Network at a later date, when Shaw instead offered to carry the channel on the digital cable tiers of its Shaw Cable systems. In spite of this, the CRTC has since rejected the restructured proposal on the basis that USA's programming would be competitive with Mystery TV.

Many of USA's original programs currently air on either Showcase or CTV Drama Channel. WWE programming that airs on USA also airs on Rogers Media-owned Sportsnet 360.

South America
Regional versions of USA Network previously operated in certain South American countries (such as Argentina and Brazil); in September 2004, most of these services were renamed under the Universal Channel banner to take advantage of the more well-known brand, and to reduce the awkwardness of a channel branded with the initials of another nation.

Logos

References

External links
 

Television networks in the United States
English-language television stations in the United States
Former Viacom subsidiaries
Joint ventures
NBC Sports
NBCUniversal networks
Television channels and stations established in 1977
Esports television